Urals oil is a reference oil brand used as a basis for pricing of the Russian export oil mixture. It is a mix of heavy sour oil of the Urals and the Volga region with light oil of Western Siberia. Other reference oils are Brent, West Texas Intermediate and Dubai.

Urals brand oil is supplied through the Baku-Novorossiysk pipeline system and the Druzhba pipeline. Urals oil futures trade on Moscow Exchange. There was also an effort to trade it on NYMEX under the name of REBCO (Russian Export Blend Crude Oil); however, not a single trade was made.

Prices for Urals grade oil are formed on the basis of the cost of Brent grade oil. Since the quality of Russian oil is lower, it costs less than the equivalent from the North Sea. The cost of Urals grade oil is 1-2 USD/barrel less than Brent. But - not always.

Urals grade oil was traded in Northwestern Europe on June 25, 2020 at a premium to Brent of $2.35/bbl - a record in the entire history of monitoring since September 1994. Since the 2022 Russian invasion of Ukraine, the price of Urals oil has dipped to $15-20 under the price of Brent.

References 

Benchmark crude oils
Petroleum in Russia